Messier 92 (also known as M92, M 92, or NGC 6341) is a globular cluster of stars in the northern constellation of Hercules.

Discovery 
It was discovered by Johann Elert Bode on December 27, 1777, then published in the Jahrbuch during 1779. It was inadvertently rediscovered by Charles Messier on March 18, 1781, and added as the 92nd entry in his catalogue. William Herschel first resolved individual stars in 1783.

Visibility 
It is one of the brighter of its sort in apparent magnitude in the northern hemisphere and in its absolute magnitude in the galaxy, but it is often overlooked by amateur astronomers due to angular proximity to bright cluster Messier 13, about 20% closer. Though when compared to M13, M92 is only slightly less bright, but about 1/3 less extended. It is visible to the naked eye under very good viewing conditions. With a small telescope, M92 can be seen as a nebulous smudge even in a severely light-polluted sky, and can be further resolved in darker conditions.

Characteristics 
It is also one of the galaxy's oldest clusters. It is about 26,700 light-years away from the Solar System.The half-light radius, or radius containing the upper half of its light emission, is 1.09 arcminutes, while the tidal radius, the broadest standard measure, is 15.17. It appears only slightly flattened: its minor axis is about 89% ± 3% of the major.

Characteristic of other globulars, it has little of the elements other than hydrogen and helium; astronomers term this low metallicity. Specifically, relative to the Sun, its iron abundance is [Fe/H] = –2.32 dex, which is 0.5% of 1.0, on this logarithmic scale, the solar abundance.

Its true diameter is 109 ly, and may have a mass corresponding to 330,000 suns.

The cluster is not yet in, nor guaranteed to undergo, core collapse and the core radius figures as about 2 arcseconds (″). It is an Oosterhoff type II (OoII) globular cluster, which means it belongs to the group of metal-poor clusters with longer period RR Lyrae variable stars. The 1997 Catalogue of Variable Stars in Globular Clusters listed 28 candidate variable stars in the cluster, although only 20 have been confirmed. As of 2001, there are 17 known RR Lyrae variables in Messier 92. 10 X-ray sources have been detected within the 1.02 arcminute half-mass radius of the cluster, of which half are candidate cataclysmic variable stars.

M92 is approaching us at 112 km/sec. Its coordinates indicate that the Earth's North Celestial Pole periodically passes less than one degree of this cluster during the precession of Earth's axis. Thus, M92 was a "Polarissima Borealis", or "North Cluster", about 12,000 years ago (10,000 BC), and it will again in about 14,000 years (16,000 AD).

Gallery

See also
 List of Messier objects

References and footnotes

External links

 
 Messier 92 @ SEDS Messier pages
 Messier 92, Galactic Globular Clusters Database page
 

Messier 092
Messier 092
092
Messier 092
Astronomical objects discovered in 1777
Discoveries by Johann Elert Bode